1711 Sandrine, provisional designation , is a stony Eoan asteroid from the outer region of the asteroid belt, approximately 23 kilometers in diameter.

This asteroid was discovered on 29 January 1935, by Belgian astronomer Eugène Delporte at the Royal Observatory of Belgium in Uccle. It was named after the grand-niece of astronomer Georges Roland.

Classification and orbit 

Sandrine  is a member of the Eos family, the largest asteroid family in the outer main belt consisting of nearly 10,000 asteroids. It orbits the Sun in the outer main-belt at a distance of 2.7–3.4 AU once every 5 years and 3 months (1,910 days). Its orbit has an eccentricity of 0.12 and an inclination of 11° with respect to the ecliptic. The body's observation arc begins with its official discovery observation.

Physical characteristics 

In the Tholen classification, Sandrine is characterized as a common S-type asteroid.

Diameter and albedo 

According to the survey carried out by NASA's Wide-field Infrared Survey Explorer with its subsequent NEOWISE mission, Sandrine measures 22.93 kilometers in diameter, and its surface has an albedo of 0.133. It has an absolute magnitude of 11.01.

Lightcurves 

As of 2017, Sandrines rotation period and shape remain unknown.

Naming 

This minor planet was named after Sandrine, a grand-niece of Georges Roland, astronomer at Uccle and co-discoverer of Comet Arend–Roland. Delporte also named 1707 Chantal and 1848 Delvaux after family members of his collaborator. The official naming citation was published by the Minor Planet Center on 8 April 1982.

References

External links 
 Asteroid Lightcurve Database (LCDB), query form (info )
 Dictionary of Minor Planet Names, Google books
 Asteroids and comets rotation curves, CdR – Observatoire de Genève, Raoul Behrend
 Discovery Circumstances: Numbered Minor Planets (1)-(5000) – Minor Planet Center
 
 

001711
Discoveries by Eugène Joseph Delporte
Named minor planets
001711
19350129